Juan García Dumois (born 5 November 1945) is a Cuban former hurdler who competed in the 1968 Summer Olympics.

References

1945 births
Living people
Cuban male hurdlers
Olympic athletes of Cuba
Athletes (track and field) at the 1968 Summer Olympics
Central American and Caribbean Games gold medalists for Cuba
Competitors at the 1970 Central American and Caribbean Games
Athletes (track and field) at the 1971 Pan American Games
Central American and Caribbean Games medalists in athletics
Pan American Games competitors for Cuba
20th-century Cuban people
21st-century Cuban people